Gamblea is a genus of plants of the family Araliaceae, comprising four species. It originally comprised a single species, Gamblea ciliata, which is found in India.

The genus's native range stretches from the Himalaya to Japan and Sumatera. It is found in Assam (part of India), China, East Himalaya, Japan, Laos, Malaya, Myanmar, Nepal, Sumatera, Tibet and Vietnam.

The genus name of Gamblea is in honour of James Sykes Gamble (1847–1925), an English botanist who specialized in the flora of the Indian sub-continent. and it was first described and published in J.D.Hooker, Fl. Brit. India Vol.2 on page 739 in 1879.

Known species
According to Kew;
Gamblea ciliata C.B.Clarke
Gamblea innovans (Siebold & Zucc.) C.B.Shang, Lowry & Frodin
Gamblea malayana (M.R.Hend.) C.B.Shang, Lowry & Frodin
Gamblea pseudoevodiaefolia (K.M.Feng) C.B.Shang, Lowry & Frodin

References

Araliaceae
Apiales genera
Plants described in 1879
Flora of China
Flora of Japan
Flora of Assam (region)
Flora of East Himalaya
Flora of Nepal
Flora of Indo-China